The 2016 Coral UK Open was a darts tournament staged by the Professional Darts Corporation. It was the fourteenth year of the tournament where, following numerous regional qualifying heats throughout Britain, players competing in a single elimination tournament to be crowned champion. The tournament was held for the third time at the Butlin's Resort in Minehead, England, between 4–6 March 2016, and has the nickname, "the FA Cup of darts" as a random draw will be staged after each round until the final.

In a repeat of last year's final, Michael van Gerwen beat Peter Wright to retain his title. During the tournament, he also hit a nine-dart finish against the then-unknown Rob Cross in the fourth round. Either side of that leg, he hit a 170 checkout, which also included a run of 19 perfect darts (treble 19, 2x treble 20, treble 19, 170 checkout (2x treble 20, bull), 9-dart leg (7x treble 20, treble 19, double 12), 2x treble 20, treble 19).

Format and qualifiers

UK Open qualifiers
There were six qualifying events staged in February 2016 to determine the UK Open Order of Merit Table. The tournament winners were:

The tournament featured 128 players. The results of the six qualifiers shown above were collated into the UK Open Order Of Merit. The top 32 players in the Order of Merit received a place at the final tournament. In addition, the next 64 players (without ties in this year's edition) in the Order of Merit list qualified for the tournament, but started in the earlier rounds played on the Friday. A further 32 players qualify via regional qualifying tournaments.

Top 32 in Order of Merit (receiving byes into third round)

Number 33–64 of the Order of Merit (receiving byes into second round)

Number 65–96 of the Order of Merit qualifiers (starting in first round)

Riley qualifiers (starting in first round)
32 amateur players qualified from Riley qualifiers held across the UK.

Prize money
The prize fund remained like last year's edition prize fund at £300,000.

Draw

Friday 4 March

First round (best of eleven legs)

Second round (best of eleven legs)

Third round (best of seventeen legs)

Saturday 5 March

Fourth round (best of seventeen legs)

Fifth round (best of seventeen legs)

Sunday 6 March

Quarter-finals (best of nineteen legs)

Semi-finals and Final

Media coverage
Like the 2015 tournament, the 2016 tournament was broadcast live in the UK on ITV4 and ITV4 HD.

References

UK Open
UK Open
UK Open
UK Open